Paul Gorham ( – June 9, 2018) was an American football coach and player. He was the head coach for the Sacred Heart Pioneers from 2004 to 2011. Gorham worked on the football staffs at Brown, New Hampshire, New Haven and UMass as an assistant coach. Gorham died on June 9, 2018, at age 57.

Head coaching record

References

External links
 Sacred Heart profile

2018 deaths
Brown Bears football coaches
New Hampshire Wildcats football coaches
New Hampshire Wildcats football players
New Haven Chargers football coaches
Sacred Heart Pioneers football coaches
UMass Minutemen football coaches
1960s births